Kwame Akuffo Anoff-Ntow is a Ghanaian journalist, academic and public servant. He was the 16th Director General of the Ghana Broadcasting Corporation from 2016 to 2018.

Anoff-Ntow was born in October 1964. He holds a doctorate degree (Doctor of Philosophy) in Communications Studies from the University of Calgary, Canada, where he used the Ghana Broadcasting Corporation as a case study for his thesis; "Public Broadcasting and the politics of media in Ghana: a case study of GBC". As an academic, his research interests are in the sphere of newsroom journalism, the politics and public broadcasting in Africa, communication policies and the politics involved in visual representation.

He is a member of the International Public Television (INPUT) forum, the Ghana Journalists Association, and the Canadian Communication Association. He also serves on the board of the African Centre for Parliamentary Affairs (ACEPA).

References 

Ghanaian civil servants
Ghanaian journalists
Ghanaian academics
University of Calgary alumni
1964 births
Living people